Bhubaneswar Municipal Corporation or BMC  is the local urban governing body of the city of Bhubaneswar in the Indian state of Odisha. The municipal corporation consists of democratically elected members, is headed by a mayor and administers the city's infrastructure and public services.

The Bhubaneswar Municipal Corporation was established in 1994. The city is divided into 67 administrative wards and 46 Revenue Villages. Each ward elects a councillor to the BMC. By means of the standing committees, the corporation undertakes urban planning and maintains roads, government-aided schools, hospitals and municipal markets. As Bhubaneswar's apex body, the corporation discharges its functions through the mayor-in-council, which comprises a mayor, a deputy mayor, and other elected members of the BMC. The functions of the BMC include water supply, drainage and sewerage, sanitation, solid waste management, street lighting and building regulation. Another ancillary civic body is the Bhubaneswar Development Authority (BDA), which is responsible for the statutory planning and development of the Greater Bhubaneswar area.

Revenue sources 

The following are the Income sources for the corporation from the Central and State Government.

Revenue from taxes 
Following is the Tax related revenue for the corporation.

 Property tax.
 Profession tax.
 Entertainment tax.
 Grants from Central and State Government like Goods and Services Tax.
 Advertisement tax.

Revenue from non-tax sources 

Following is the Non Tax related revenue for the corporation.

 Water usage charges.
 Fees from Documentation services.
 Rent received from municipal property.
 Funds from municipal bonds.

Achievements

Services
BMC has undertaken pioneering work in various fields and perceives its role as principal provider of services as detailed below to provide a better quality of life to the Bhubaneswarites.
 Health & Sanitation
 Slum Development
 Disaster Management
 City Beautification
 Citizen Services
 Efficient Solid Waste Management
 Underground Sewerage System
 Efficient Urban Planning and Development
 Water Supply Services
 City Bus Services
 Online Services
 Vending Zones
 Parking Zones

Particulars of each of the service undertaken by BMC
 Marriage Registration Certificate
 Issue of Birth & Death Certificate
 Timely Grievance redressal system through Mobile App.
 Online Booking of Kalyan Mandap
 Online Booking of Mahajatra Vehicle
 Citizen Grievance
 Water Tanker Reservation
 Booking of Cess pool emptier
 Implementation of Swachha Bhubaneswar Abhijan

Organization Structure
Organization Structure for Bhubaneswar Municipal Corporation

Boundaries
North Side - Daruthenga, Raghunathpur, Kalarahanga, Injena, Rokata, Krushna Saranapur, Barimunda, Kacharamala.
East Side - Janmejayapur, Bhimpur, Jaganathpur, Saleswar, Andilo, Kuakhai River, Koradakanta, Kesura, Bankual, Basuaghai,  Raghunathpur.
South Side - Daya River, Kukudaghai, Mohanpur, Dihapur, Balabhadrapur, Erabanga, Kochilaput, Bahadalpur, Sarankantar, Raysinghpur, Papada, Sankarpur, Paikarapur.
West Side - Nuagan, Malipada, Andharua, Jaganathprasada, Sundarpur, Patha-rgadia.

References

External links

Municipal corporations in Odisha
Government of Bhubaneswar
1994 establishments in Orissa